Algernon Seymour may refer to:

 Algernon Seymour, 7th Duke of Somerset (1684–1750), MP for Marlborough and Northumberland
 Algernon St Maur, 14th Duke of Somerset (former: Seymour, 14th Duke of Somerset, 1813–1894), English peer, father of the 15th Duke
 Algernon Seymour, 15th Duke of Somerset (1846–1923), English peer, sailor, soldier and patron
 Algernon Seymour (priest) (1886–1933), Anglican priest and Provost of St. Mary's Cathedral, Glasgow

See also
 Algernon (name)
 Seymour (surname)